Holochilus chacarius, also known as the Chacoan marsh rat or Chaco marsh rat, is a semiaquatic rodent species in the family Cricetidae. It is found in Argentina and Paraguay within the Gran Chaco.

Description
This marsh rat is one of the smallest in the genus. The dorsal pelage is pale reddish-brown, with long black guard hairs, the flanks are buff or ochre, the throat and chest are white and the rest of the underparts are buff or grey, the hairs having white bases.

Distribution and habitat
The Chaco marsh rat is native to Paraguay and the notheasten part of Argentina, being present in the provinces of Salta, Jujuy, Tucumán, Formosa, Chaco and Córdoba. It is a semi-aquatic species and is found in swamps and other areas of wetland, flooded pasture and cultivated fields, but seldom in forested habitats. In Paraguay it inhabits ground well covered in leaf litter and herbaceous plants.

Ecology
The Chaco marsh rat can swim and dive, and can also climb well; it is a herbivore, feeding on a range of plant materials including sugarcane, rice, banana and other crops. Litter sizes range from four to nine, and the young mature at sixty days.

Status
The Chaco marsh rat is common in some areas and less so in others. The overall population is thought to be declining, but the rat has a wide range and is present in a number of protected areas, so the International Union for Conservation of Nature has assessed its conservation status as being of "least concern".

References

Holochilus
Mammals of Argentina
Mammals of Paraguay
Mammals described in 1906
Taxa named by Oldfield Thomas
Taxonomy articles created by Polbot